Sphenomorphus nigrolineatus  is a species of skink found in Papua New Guinea.

References

nigrolineatus
Reptiles described in 1897
Taxa named by George Albert Boulenger
Skinks of New Guinea